Falu BK was a sports club in Falun, Sweden. The men's bandy team played in the Swedish top division in 1934. The men's soccer team played in the Swedish third division during the seasons of 1934–1935 and 1935–1936.

In 1935 the club was one of four clubs who merged to become Falu BS.

References 

1935 disestablishments in Sweden
Defunct bandy clubs in Sweden
Defunct football clubs in Sweden
Sport in Falun
Sports clubs disestablished in 1935